Kuntur Wachana (Quechua kuntur condor, wacha birth, to give birth, -na a suffix, 'where the condor is born', also spelled Condor Huachana) is a  mountain in the Bolivian Andes. It is located in the Cochabamba Department, Capinota Province, Sicaya Municipality.

References 

Mountains of Cochabamba Department